La Barillette (1,525 m) is one of the highest points of Canton Vaud's Jura mountains in Switzerland.

Mountains of Switzerland
Mountains of the canton of Vaud
Mountains of the Jura
One-thousanders of Switzerland